USDA Rural Development (RD) is a mission area within the United States Department of Agriculture which runs programs intended to improve the economy and quality of life in rural parts of the United States.

Rural Development has a loan portfolio over $224.5 billion, and administers nearly $16 billion in program loans, loan guarantees, and grants through their programs. Rural Development promotes economic development by supporting loans to businesses through banks, credit unions and community-managed lending pools. It offers technical assistance and information to help agricultural producers and cooperatives get started and improve the effectiveness of their operations. Rural Development also provides technical assistance to help communities undertake community empowerment programs and helps rural residents buy or rent safe, affordable housing and make health and safety repairs to their homes.

History
The Rural Development Administration (RDA) was a USDA agency established by the 1990 farm bill (P.L. 101-624, Sec. 2302), amending the Consolidated Farm and Rural Development Act of 1972 (7 U.S.C. 1921 et seq.), to administer FmHA community and business programs and other USDA rural development programs. After a brief period named "Rural Economic and Community Development" (P.L. 103-354 Subtitle C), RDA was superseded by the Office of Rural Development following the 1994 reorganization of USDA authorized by P.L. 103-354.

On October 13, 1994, the Department of Agriculture was reorganized under the Federal Crop Insurance Reform Act of 1994 and Department of Agriculture Reorganization Act of 1994. Under that act, USDA Rural Development was created to administer the former Farmers Home Administration's (FmHA) non-farm financial programs for rural housing, community facilities, water and waste disposal, and rural businesses. The former Rural Electrification Administration's (REA) utility programs were also consolidated within Rural Development.

Operating units 
 Rural Business-Cooperative Service (RBS)
 Rural Housing Service (RHS)
 Rural Utilities Service (RUS)

References 

1994 establishments in the United States
Government agencies established in 1994
Rural
Rural community development
Rural development in the United States
Rural